Frederick Flaxington Harker (1876–1936) was an American organist and composer of sacred music.

Biography
He was born in Scotland.  He became the assistant organist to T. Tertius Noble at York Minster.  He emigrated to the United States at 25, and served as Organist and Choirmaster of All Souls Episcopal Church in Asheville, North Carolina.  He moved to New York city in 1904 but returned to All Souls in 1907.  Beginning in 1914, Harker served as Organist and Choirmaster at St. Paul's Episcopal Church in Richmond, Virginia.

Music
Harker composed cantatas, anthems, choruses, songs both sacred and secular, and some works for organ.  Harker was active as a music editor for G. Schirmer Inc.  He edited many choral works, organ pieces, and John Stainer's classic text for organ students, The Organ.

Selected musical compositions
Sacred songs for voice and piano or organ

As it began to dawn (Easter)
Awake up, my glory (Easter)
Consider, and hear me
God shall wipe away all tears
How beautiful upon the mountains
Like as the hart desireth the water-brooks
O Love that wilt not let me go
O Perfect Love (Wedding song)
They that sow in tears shall reap in joy
Turn ye even to me with all your heart

Footnotes

References

External links
 some music by Harker available for download
F. Flaxington Harker sheet music from the Ball State University Digital Media Repository

1876 births
1936 deaths
American male composers
American composers
American male organists
Scottish emigrants to the United States
American organists